The 1983 season was Daewoo's first ever season in the Korean Super League in South Korea. Daewoo competed in League.

Players

Squad

Squad stats

Competition

Korean Super League

Standings

Matches

Source : K-League
KSL : Korean Super League
1Daewoo goals come first.

References

1983
Daewoo
1983 in South Korean football